Rule of man (where "man" is  used in a genderless manner) is a type of personal rule in an unaccountable rebounded society where rules change from ruler to ruler. It is a society in which one person, regime, or a group of persons, rules arbitrarily. While rule of man can be explained as the absence of rule of law, this theoretical understanding results in a paradox. Realism dictates that man and law do not stand apart and that the rules of each are not opposites. Rather law depends deeply on a state composed of men.

On the other hand, as a positive concept, the rule of man, "a man capable of ruling better than the best laws", was championed in ancient Greek philosophy and thinking as early as Plato. The debate between rule of man versus rule of law extends to Plato's student Aristotle, and to Confucius and the Legalists in Chinese philosophy.

About

Negative associations 
Rule of man is associated with numerous negative concepts such as tyranny, dictatorship and despotism, and their variations that have taken the form of the Thirty Tyrants, the Jacobin dictatorship (Reign of Terror) during the French Revolution, Caesarism, Bonapartism and Spiritual gift (also known as charismatic power or charism), and regimes like Joseph Stalin and the Communist Party of the Soviet Union, and Adolf Hitler and the Nazi Party. Bad government is considered inherent to personal rule. Despite theoretical associations of what constitutes a bad or good government, political realism dictates that rules will be established irrespective of the rulers being dictatorial or democratic, one or many.

Rule of man vs. rule of law

As independent and oppositional notions 

Aristotle associated individual rule to the absence of reason, to be animal-like, "to invest law then with authority is, it seems, to invest God and reason only; to invest a man is to introduce a beast, as desire is something bestial, and even the best of men in authority are liable to be corrupted by passion. We may conclude then that the law is reason without passion and is therefore preferable to any individual." However Plato, Aristotle's teacher, had championed the rule of man, "an exceptional figure, capable of ruling better than the best laws". The Sovereign exercises absolute authority and is not bound by any law, he as a person exists outside law; the philosopher Thomas Hobbes advocated such a society (including in his book Leviathan), saying that a society would be better if it had one absolute monarch as he would be free to choose and do what he thinks is best for the society without taking into account the opinions of others.

James Harrington would go on to pen the phrase "a government of laws and not of men" in 1656, which in turn found its way into the Constitution of Massachusetts where John Adams was the principal author. In the 1803 Marbury v. Madison U.S Supreme Court case, Chief Justice John Marshall wrote "The government of the United States has been emphatically termed a government of laws, and not of men." In 1977, a former Supreme Court of India judge, Hans Raj Khanna stated in a speech,

Countries such as China have developed and transitioned from 'rule of man' to 'rule by law', and finally to 'rule of law' from 1970s onwards. During the cultural revolution in China Mao Zedong was quoted as saying "Depend on the rule of man, not the rule of law"; however by the 1970s Mao started advocating a law based society in theory. However similar concepts had their own origins in China as early as 536 BC, when Zi Chan attempted to make law less arbitrary and more permanent by getting it inscribed and put on public display. , translated by western scholars as 'rule of man', could be better explained as 'rule of people'.

Absence of rule of law implies the absence of a legislature, judiciary, and a legal administrative and enforcement system. On the other hand rule of man is associated with the lack of a legal system, that is, lawlessness.

As dependent and overlapping notions 
Laws, and the rule of law, is not isolated from man and the rule of man. There are a number of overlaps between the rule of man and the rule of law. Considering the rule of law and rule of man as independent opposites results in a paradox as law occurs within a state, and not independently.

See also 

 Anomie
List of forms of government
Self-rule

References 
Notes

References

Bibliography
 

 

— 
—

Further reading

Audio
 The Rule of Law v the Rule of Man. BBC Radio 4.

Dictatorship
Legal concepts
Political concepts
Philosophy of law